The Egba United Government (EUG) was a political entity in the late 19th century in what is today Nigeria. The Government was formally established  by the Lagos Colony Governor - Mccallum at a meeting organised in 1898, by William Alfred Allen an Egba man who was the Colonial Government Agent in Abeokuta. William Alfred Allen was appointed the First Secretary to the Government by the Colonial government while the Egba rulers were given government portfolios. Allen was eventually succeeded by Adegboyega Edun.

The EUG was recognized by the British at the end of the Yoruba civil wars in 1893, thus making it one of Africa's legally existing nation-states (at least according to modern international law) to remain independent during the Scramble for Africa. Its independence did not last for long, however, as the nature of the government, which placed constraints on the power of the king, was antithetical to Frederick Lugard's vision of "indirect rule": he therefore had it dissolved under the pretext of the king and his chiefs inviting the British monarch to serve as their protector in the aftermath of a period of internal civil strife in the early part of the 20th century.

References
Canby, Courtlandt. The Encyclopedia of Historic Places. (New York: Facts of File Publicantions, 1984) p. 2

History of Nigeria
1898 establishments in the British Empire
History of Abeokuta